Julia Thurnau (born 21 May 1974) is a French-German actress and artist. She grew up in a village close to Cannes, later moved to Munich where she did acting studies at the Schauspielstudio München, then actors training at the Ernst Busch acting school Berlin.

She first appeared in the film After Five in the Forest Primeval with Franka Potente in 1995.  Since that she had major roles in more than 20 French and German cinema movies and TV-films, such as Der Weibsteufel (2000) by Jo Baier and D'Artagnan et les trois mousquetaires (2005) by Pierre Aknine. She had her debut as a director with the short film Ondinas (2003) and is also working in the field of fine arts.

Cinema films (selection) 

 1995: After Five in the Forest Primeval
 1997: Das merkwürdige Verhalten geschlechtsreifer Großstädter zur Paarungszeit
 1998: Tag ohne Gestern
 1999: Schmetterlinge der Nacht
 2000: Bitte schön, danke schön
 2001: 
 2001: Leo & Claire
 2001: Brief des Kosmonauten
 2002: Ein seltsames Paar
 2002: Pieces of my Heart
 2003: Chicken Salad to Disaster
 2003: Ondinas
 2004: Trois Mousquetaires
 2005: Zwischenzeit
 2006: Lumen
 2015: 3 Türken und ein Baby

TV (selection) 

 1996: So ist das Leben! Die Wagenfelds
 1997: SOKO 5113 - Dumm gelaufen
 1997: First Love – Das verflixte 1. Mal
 1998: Der Clown
 1999: Der Weibsteufel
 1999: Geregelte Verhältnisse
 1999: Urlaub in Marokko
 2000: Nikola
 2000: Polizeiruf 110
 2000: Wie angelt man sich einen Müllmann
 2001/2002: Liebe, Lügen, Leidenschaften
 2001: Du oder keine
 2001: Nicht ohne meinen Anwalt
 2002: Auch Erben will gelernt sein
 2002: Der Bulle von Tölz
 2002: Er oder keiner
 2003: Was nicht passt, wird passend gemacht
 2004: SOKO Kitzbühel
 2004: Tatort
 2005: Der Mann, den Frauen wollen
 2005: SOKO Wien
 2005: Die Rosenheim Cops- Der Tote am See
 2005: Wer entführt meine Frau?
 2006: Agathe kann's nicht lassen
 2006: Alarm für Cobra 11

Theater (selection) 
 2002: Birdsong, Regie: Beatrice Murmann
 2004: Liebst du mich Lump, Regie: Beatrice Murmann
 2005: Fräulein Julie, Regie: Marcel Krohn
 2007: The vagina monologues, director: Laurie Norquist
 2009: Roses Geheimnis, Regie: Frank Mattus

External links 

www.juliathurnau.com

1974 births
German film actresses
German television actresses
French film actresses
Living people
French television actresses
German expatriates in France
German stage actresses
French stage actresses
20th-century German actresses
20th-century French actresses
21st-century German actresses
21st-century French actresses